The 2nd Metro Manila Film Festival was held in the year 1976. It was known as 1976 Filipino Film Festival at that time.

Eddie Romero's Ganito Kami Noon, Paano Kayo Ngayon received most of the awards with a total of six including the Best Film and Metro Manila Film Festival Award for Best Actor for Christopher de Leon. Lino Brocka's Insiang received four including Metro Manila Film Festival Award for Best Actress for Hilda Koronel. 

A total of 10 movies were exhibited during the 10-day festival which opened for the first time on Christmas Day (December 25). JE Productions' Dateline Chicago: Arrest The Nurse Killer emerged as the Top Grosser.

Entries

Awards
Winners are listed first and highlighted in boldface.

Multiple awards

References

External links

Metro Manila Film Festival: Awards for 1976 at the Internet Movie Database

Metro Manila Film Festival
1976 MMFF
MMFF
MMFF